James Edwin Otto (born January 5, 1938) is an American former professional football player who played as a center for the Oakland Raiders of the American Football League (AFL) and National Football League (NFL) for 15 seasons. He played college football at the University of Miami for the Miami Hurricanes.

Otto was inducted into the Pro Football Hall of Fame in 1980, his first year of eligibility.

Early years
Born and raised in Wausau, Wisconsin, Otto played football at Wausau High School under coach Win Brockmeyer.  He played college football in south Florida at the University of Miami, where he joined the Phi Delta Theta fraternity.  In addition to playing offensive center at the University of Miami, he also played linebacker on defense.

Professional career
No National Football League team showed interest in the undersized center. Otto was drafted by the proposed Minneapolis franchise of the new American Football League. When the Minneapolis contingent reneged to accept an NFL franchise, Otto's rights defaulted to the AFL's Oakland Raiders. He then signed with the Raiders and played for the entire ten years of the league's existence and five years beyond. He was issued jersey number 50 for the AFL's inaugural season, 1960, but switched to his familiar 00 the next season.

For the next 15 years, Otto was a fixture at center for the Raiders, never missing a single game due to injury, and played in 210 consecutive games. He won one AFL/AFC championship in 1967 against the Houston Oilers with the Raiders, but lost five: in 1968, 1969, 1970, 1973, and 1974 to the New York Jets, Kansas City Chiefs, Baltimore Colts, Miami Dolphins, and Pittsburgh Steelers, respectively, with all five teams winning the Super Bowl. He played alongside Gene Upshaw, another Hall of Famer, at left guard from 1967 to 1974. In the 1967 regular season, Oakland scored 468 points (33.4 points/game), leading the AFL, but lost Super Bowl II to the Green Bay Packers. In 1968, Oakland scored 453 points (32.4 points/game) in the regular season, again leading the AFL, and beat the Chiefs in the divisional round (unscheduled tiebreaker) before losing to the Jets. In the 1969 regular season, Oakland scored 377 points (26.9 points/game) to lead the AFL for the third consecutive year, and beat the Houston Oilers in the new divisional round of the AFL playoffs before losing to the Chiefs. In the 1970 regular season, the first year of the NFL-AFL merger, Oakland scored 300 points (21.4 points/game), ranking ninth in the 26-team NFL, and beat the Miami Dolphins in the AFC playoffs before losing to the Colts. The Raiders missed the playoffs for the first time in five years in 1971, despite scoring 344 points (24.6 points/game), second highest in the NFL.

The Raiders came back stronger in 1972, scoring 365 points (26.1 points/game), ranking third in the NFL, but lost 13–7 to the Pittsburgh Steelers in the divisional round of the AFC playoffs, the famous Immaculate Reception game, in which Otto also made the only pass reception of his professional career. In the 1973 regular season, Oakland scored 292 points (20.9 points/game), tenth in the NFL, and avenged their defeat to the Steelers but lost to the Dolphins. In Otto's final year, 1974, Oakland scored 355 points (25.4 points/game), leading the NFL, and avenged their playoff loss to the Dolphins but lost to the Steelers again. In 1975, he was replaced by Dave Dalby, in his fourth season out of UCLA. Otto was the last member of the Oakland Raiders inaugural team from 1960 to retire.

Otto was one of only twenty players to play for the entire ten-year existence of the American Football League, and one of only three players to play in all of his team's AFL games. Otto was also selected as The Sporting News All-League center from 1960 through 1969.  He was an All-Star in the first 13 of his 15 seasons – every year in the AFL from 1960 through 1969 and three of his five seasons in the NFL. He was also named the starting center on the AFL All-Time Team.

He was elected to the Pro Football Hall of Fame in 1980, the first year he was eligible.  In 1999, he was ranked number 78 on The Sporting News''' list of the 100 Greatest Football Players. In 2019, he was revealed as being selected to the National Football League 100th Anniversary All-Time Team.

Injuries and operations
Otto's body was punished greatly during his NFL career, resulting in nearly 74 operations, including 28 on his knee (nine of them during his playing career) and multiple joint replacements.  His joints became riddled with arthritis, and he developed debilitating back and neck problems. In his book, "The Pain of Glory" Otto described near-death experiences from medical procedures, including fighting off three life-threatening infections due to complications from his artificial joints. During one six-month stretch, he was without a right knee joint because he had to wait for an infection to heal before another artificial knee could be implanted. Otto eventually had to have his right leg amputated on August 1, 2007. Despite his maladies, Otto says he has no regrets and wouldn't change a thing even if given the opportunity to do it over again. He discussed his sports injuries as well as the concussions issue in a 2013 Frontline interview for "League of Denial: The NFL's Concussion Crisis".

Personal life
Otto was also the subject of 'The Jim Otto Suite', a series of three multimedia works by American contemporary artist Matthew Barney which served as a precursor to The Cremaster Cycle.

He was elected to the Wisconsin Athletic Hall of Fame in 1998.

See also
Bay Area Sports Hall of Fame
List of most consecutive starts by National Football League players
Other American Football League players

References
 Jim Otto: The Pain of Glory'' by Jim Otto
 Jim Otto by Dave Newhouse

External links
 
 
 

1938 births
Living people
American Football League All-League players
American Football League All-Star players
American Football League All-Time Team
American Football League players
American Conference Pro Bowl players
American football centers
American football linebackers
American amputees
Miami Hurricanes football players
Oakland Raiders players
Players of American football from Wisconsin
Pro Football Hall of Fame inductees
Sportspeople from Wausau, Wisconsin